Donna Moore may refer to:
 Donna Moore (horse trainer) (1931–2014), American Saddlebred horse trainer
 Donna Moore (novelist) (born 1962), Scottish novelist
 Donna Moore (strongwoman), British strongwoman